Jonathan Pérez may refer to:

 Jonathan Pérez (footballer, born 1987), French footballer
 Jonathan Pérez (footballer, born 2003), Mexican footballer
 Jonathan Pérez (musician) (born 1979), Chilean drummer